Radoslav Kasabov (born 30 January 1938) is a Bulgarian wrestler. He competed at the 1960 Summer Olympics and the 1964 Summer Olympics.

References

External links
 

1938 births
Living people
Bulgarian male sport wrestlers
Olympic wrestlers of Bulgaria
Wrestlers at the 1960 Summer Olympics
Wrestlers at the 1964 Summer Olympics
Sportspeople from Ruse, Bulgaria